Bishop Juraj Jezerinac (born 23 April 1939) is a Croatian Roman Catholic prelate who served as a Titular Bishop of Strumnitza and Auxiliary Bishop of Archdiocese of Zagreb from 11 April 1991 until 25 April 1997 and the first Ordinary of the new created Military Ordinariate of Croatia since 25 April 1997 until his retirement on 30 November 2015.

Education
Bishop Jezerinac was born into a Croatian Roman Catholic family of Mijo and Barica (née Bradica) near Krašić in the Central Croatia. 

After graduation a classical gymnasium in Šalata, Zagreb, he consequently joined the Theological Faculty at the University of Zagreb, and was ordained as priest on June 26, 1966 for his native the Roman Catholic Archdiocese of Zagreb, in Zagreb, after completed his philosophical and theological studies.

Pastoral work
Fr. From 1971 to 1980 he served as parish priest in the newly established parish of the Heart of Mary in Sesvetski Kraljevec. He then went to Canada where he performed the following services: from 1980 to 1985 he was chaplain of the Croatian parish of Our Lady the Queen of Croats in Toronto; from 1985 to 1986 parish administrator in Oakville, and from 1986 to 1988 chaplain in Hamilton. From 1988 to 1991 he was parish priest of the Croatian parish in Oakville.

On April 11, 1991, he was appointed by Pope John Paul II as an Auxiliary Bishop of the Archdiocese of Zagreb. On June 8, 1991, he was consecrated as bishop by Cardinal Franjo Kuharić and other prelates of the Roman Catholic Church in the Cathedral of Assumption of Blessed Virgin Mary and St. Stephen of Hungary in Zagreb. A six years later, on April 25, 1997, he become the first Ordinary of the new created Military Ordinariate of Croatia.

Retired on November 30, 2015, after reached age limit of 75 years old.

References

1939 births
Living people
People from Zagreb County
University of Zagreb alumni
Croatian expatriates in Canada
20th-century Roman Catholic bishops in Croatia
21st-century Roman Catholic bishops in Croatia
Bishops appointed by Pope John Paul II